Costantinos Tsobanoglou (26 January 1995 – 11 March 2023), better known by his stage name Costa Titch, was a South African Amapiano rapper and dancer.

Biography 
Costa Titch's  father is Greek while his mother is South African. He was born in South Africa. Early on, Costa Titch had a passion for entertainment and became a dancer. In 2014, he relocated to Johannesburg, where he continued his career as a rapper.

In 2020, Costa Titch released his debut album titled Made In Africa, which features collaborations with various South African artists such as AKA, Riky Rick, and Boity. The album received critical acclaim and was a commercial success, cementing Costa Titch's position as one of the rising stars in South African music. He went on earn 3 nominations to South African Hip Hop Awards 2020  and won the best collaboration for "Nkalakatha Remix" featuring AKA and Riky Rick for the remake of Nkalakatha  originally by Mandoza.

His track "Ayeye" was particularly well received, due to its uplifting message about staying positive despite life's difficulties. Another one of his tracks, "Big Flexa", broke the record for the most viewed Amapiano music video on YouTube in December 2022. In the same year, he earned joint most nominations 7 to the All Africa Music Awards 2022.

Costa Titch also collaborated with Senegalese-American singer Akon for a remix of the song "Big Flexa", featuring contributions from fellow Amapiano musician Alfa Kat and producer Ma Gang.

Death 
On 11 March 2023, Costa Titch collapsed when performing at the Ultra South Africa music festival in Johannesburg. He quickly regained his footing and continued performing, but collapsed again and died at age 28. The cause of his death is not yet known.

Discography
Studio albums
 Mr Big Flexa (2022)  
 Made in Africa (2020)  

Collaborative albums
 You're Welcome (2021) feat. AKA  

Extended plays
 Trapiano Vol.1 (2022) 
 For Real Trappers Only (2018) 
 OMWTFYB
 Wonderland (2018) 
 Gqom Land
 Fallen Kings

Awards and nominations

Soundcity MVP Awards Festival 

! 
|-
|rowspan=7|2023 
|rowspan=5|"Big Flexa" (featuring C’Buda M, Alfa Kat, Banaba Des, Sdida & Man T)
|Viewers’ Choice 
|
|rowspan=7|
|-
|Video of the Year
|

All Africa Music Awards 

! 
|-
|rowspan=7|2022 
|rowspan=5|"Big Flexa" (featuring C’Buda M, Alfa Kat, Banaba Des, Sdida & Man T)
|Best African Collaboration 
|
|rowspan=7|
|-
|Best Artiste/Duo/Group in African Dance/Choreography 
|
|-
|Best Artiste/Duo/Group in African Electro
| 
|-
|Best African Video
|
|-
|Song of the Year 
| 
|-
|"Ma Gang" (featuring Phantom Steeze, ManT, Sdida, C'Buda M & Champuru Makhenzo)
|Breakout Artist of the Year
| 
|-
|"Moyo" Mbosso (featuring Costa Titch & Phantom Steeze)
|Best African Collaboration 
|

South African Hip Hop Awards 

! 
|-
|rowspan=7|2020 
|rowspan=5|"Nkalakatha Remix" (featuring AKA & Riky Rick)
|Song of the Year 
|
|rowspan=7|
|-
|Best Collaboration
|
|-
|Best Remix
|

References 

1995 births
2023 deaths
21st-century South African male singers
Filmed deaths of entertainers
Musicians who died on stage
People from Mbombela
South African hip hop musicians
South African people of Greek descent
White South African people